German submarine U-294 was a Type VIIC/41 U-boat of Nazi Germany's Kriegsmarine during World War II.

She was laid down on 22 December 1942 by the Bremer Vulkan Werft (yard) at Bremen-Vegesack as yard number 59, launched on 27 August 1943, and commissioned on 4 October with Oberleutnant zur See Heinz Schütt in command.

In five patrols, she sank or damaged no ships.

She surrendered at Narvik in Norway on 9 May 1945 and was sunk as part of Operation Deadlight on 31 December 1945.

Design
German Type VIIC/41 submarines were preceded by the shorter Type VIIB submarines. U-294 had a displacement of  when at the surface and  while submerged. She had two shafts and two  propellers.

U-294 was fitted with five  torpedo tubes (four fitted at the bow and one at the stern), fourteen torpedoes, one  SK C/35 naval gun, (220 rounds), one  Flak M42 and two  C/30 anti-aircraft guns. The boat had a complement of between forty-four and sixty.

Service history

The boat's service life began with training with the 8th U-boat Flotilla in October 1943. She was then transferred to the 11th flotilla for operations on 1 August 1944. She was reassigned to the 13th flotilla on 6 November and moved again to the 14th flotilla on 1 March 1945.

First and second patrols
U-294s first patrol took her to northeast of the Shetland Islands. It was preceded by a short voyage between Kiel in Germany and Stavanger in Norway in May 1944.

More brief sojourns followed, using Bergen, Flekkefjord and Kiel.

The boat's second 'official' patrol was between 18 and 24 September 1944.

Third and fourth patrols
The submarine's third sortie took her as far as the North Sea.

More short voyages were carried out, using Flekkefjord, Horten Naval Base and Tönsberg in October and November 1944.

Her fourth patrol started and finished in Bergen, but included a stop in Trondheim.

Fifth patrol and fate
U-294 departed Narvik and arrived at Harstad (northwest of Narvik), before going on to Skjomenfjord, in April 1945.

She arrived at Loch Eriboll in northern Scotland on 19 May 1945 and then moved to Lisahally (Londonderry port), for Operation Deadlight.

See also
 Battle of the Atlantic (1939-1945)

References

Bibliography

External links

German Type VIIC/41 submarines
U-boats commissioned in 1943
1943 ships
World War II submarines of Germany
Ships built in Bremen (state)
Operation Deadlight
U-boats sunk in 1945
U-boats sunk by British warships
Maritime incidents in December 1945